De Witt is Dutch for "The White".  De Witt, DeWitt or Dewitt may refer to:

People

 DeWitt (name)
 De Witt (surname)
 De Witt (family), a patrician family from the Dutch Golden Age, especially:
 Johan de Witt (1625–1672), statesman at the time of the First and Second Anglo-Dutch Wars

Places 
In Australia:
 De Witt Island, Tasmania, Australia

In the United States:
 DeWitt, Arkansas
 Dewitt, Lassen County, California, an unincorporated community
 DeWitt, Illinois, a village in DeWitt County
 DeWitt Township, DeWitt County, Illinois
 DeWitt County, Illinois
 DeWitt, Iowa
 DeWitt, Michigan, a city in Clinton County
 DeWitt Charter Township, Michigan, in Clinton County
 De Witt, Missouri
 De Witt, Nebraska
 DeWitt, New York
 DeWitt County, Texas
 DeWitt, Virginia
 Dewitt, West Virginia

Other
 DeWitt Motor Company, early 20th century US automobile company
 DeWitt notation, mathematical notation
 DeWitt Clause, usage restrictions in software licenses, named for computer scientist David DeWitt

See also

 de Wit
 de Witte (disambiguation)